Louis Loong Hon-biu is the secretary general of the Real Estate Developers Association of Hong Kong.

Electoral history

References 

Living people
Year of birth missing (living people)
HK LegCo Members 2022–2025
Hong Kong pro-Beijing politicians